The 1989 NCAA Division II women's soccer tournament was the second annual NCAA-sponsored tournament to determine the team national champion of Division II women's college soccer in the United States.

The championship was hosted at Barry University in Miami Shores, Florida.

Hosts Barry defeated Keene State in the final, 4–0, to claim their first national title.

Qualified teams

Bracket

See also 
1989 NCAA Division I Women's Soccer Tournament
NCAA Division III Women's Soccer Championship
1989 NCAA Division II Men's Soccer Championship
NAIA Women's Soccer Championship

References 

NCAA Division II Women's Soccer Championship
NCAA Division II Women's Soccer Tournament
NCAA Division II Women's Soccer Tournament
NCAA Division II Women's Soccer Tournament